Sherman E. Burroughs may refer to:
 Sherman Everett Burroughs (1870–1923), U.S. congressman from New Hampshire
 Sherman E. Burroughs (United States Navy) (1903–1992), his son, United States Navy admiral
 Sherman E. Burroughs High School, California, USA, named for the admiral